Jolgeh District is a district (bakhsh) in Isfahan County, Isfahan Province, Iran. At the 2006 census, its population was 19,527, in 5,313 families.  The District has two cities: Harand and Ezhiyeh.  The District has two rural districts (dehestan): Emamzadeh Abdol Aziz Rural District and Rudasht Rural District.

References 

Isfahan County
Districts of Isfahan Province